Established in 2015, the Artists' File Initiative (AFI) is an archival project located in The Spencer Art Reference Library at the Nelson-Atkins Museum of Art.

The mission of AFI is to create archival files documenting the careers of the creative community of Kansas City, Missouri. In pursuit of this mission, the Artists' File Initiative takes an active role in collaborating with artists to create in-depth archival files documenting their artistic career. The project helps local artists preserve their legacy, as well as provides access to researchers who request information on local artists.  The files are a resource that is used by scholars, artists, curators and anyone interested in learning more about the arts community in this region.

Contents
For a file to be considered complete, it must contain an Artist's statement, a résumé, a gallery or museum exhibition announcement, published reviews, annotated exhibition checklists, annotated exhibition gallery shots, as well as any other additional supporting material.

Participants

A 

Adelman, Maryanna
Alfie, Marie 
Anderson, Barry
Angilan, Ione

B

Baer, Joy 
Bennett, Philomene
Benson, Lynn
Benton, Thomas Hart
Berman, Laura
Blitt, Rita
Bonds, NedRa
Booth, Jane
Bransby, Eric
Briendenthal, Derrick
Bricker-Pugh, Jennifer
Burk, James Jeffrey
Bussell, Joe

C

Cannon, Mary
Carstenson, Cecil
Clews, Rebecca
Cobler, Jeanine
Conry, Maura
Coonrod, Mary Ann
Corbin, Tom
Copt, Louis J.
Cusumano Miller, Karen

D

Dirks, Teresa
Dougherty, Aaron

E

Eigles, Lorrie
Eldred, Dale
Erickson, William W

F

Faus, Jose
Ferguson, Ken
Flynn, Genevieve E
Ford, David
Freed, Douglass
French, Diallo Javonne
Fuhrman, Andrea

G

Gilluly, John
Goldman, Lester
Gordon, Shea
Goslin, Charles
Gottschall, Bret
Gowin, Elijah
Grossman, Lisa
Guile, Rita
Gutowski, John

H

Harryman, Shirley
Henk, Diane
High, Anthony
Hoelzel, Elise
Honig, Peregrine
Howard, Jean
Hughes, Holly
Hunter-Putsch, Sharon

I

Ira, George
Irwin, Nina

J

James, Frederic
Jennings, Angie

K

Koch, Ada
Kraft, Arthur
Kren, Margo
Kuemmerlein, Janet

L

Laser, Sid
Leedy, Jim
Leffel, Paula
Leffel, Russel C.
Leitch, Christopher
Lighton, Gertrude Woolf
Lighton, Linda
Lyon, Mike

M

MacMorris, Daniel
McAnany, Larry
Madera, Edna
Majo
Marak, Lou
Merrill, Hugh
Miller Gross, Marcie
Morrow, David A. Sr.

N

Nichols, Robyn
Niewald, Wilbur

O

Ochs, John
Ortiz, Chris
Osa, Doug
Othic, Nora

P

Parker, Jennifer R
Peet, Margo
Pronko, Jane

Q

Quackenbush, Robert J

R

Revenaugh, Katrina
Richerson, Modesta
Rivera, Miguel
Rodriquez, Sharon M.

S

Sajovic, Jim
Scapellati, Al
Schliefke, Michael
Shikles, Anita
Slowinski, Ron
Smith, Nelson
Steen, Karen
Stewart, Bridget
Summers, R. Gregory
Szasz, Frank

T

Tanner, Jay R.
Templeton, Robert
Thomas, Larry
Tibbetts, John C.
Titterington, David
Toh, Heinrich
Toombs, Michael
Torres, Barnadette Esperanza
Trease, Fred
Triplett, Lori Lee
Trotter, Vickie

V

VanHoozer, Robin
Velasco, Maria
Vesce, Catherine
Vogel-Hyde, Anita
Voorhees, Jane

W

Watne, Davin
Weissenbach, Rashelle
Werts, Diana
Wheeler, Terri
Wieser, Clifford P.
Wilimovsky, Charles
Williams, Debbie Scott
Wyeth, Megan

Y

Yaworski, Alex F.
Yaworski, Don

Z

Zastoupil, Carol

Contributors
Before the beginning of this project, Marilyn Carbonell, head of Library Services, spoke with gallerists, artists, the museum's director, trustees, and the Nelson-Atkins Museum Business Council.  Todd Weiner, of Todd Weiner Gallery in Crossroads, Kansas City, has worked as an artist liaison on this project, and assists Carbonell in connecting with artists wishing to participate by depositing material in the artists' files. Janet Simpson, Executive Director of the Kansas City Artists Coalition, also plays an active role in AFI by encouraging artists to archive and letting artists know about AFI. The files themselves are co-curated with an art librarian and the contributing artist.

Process
The process of creating the files begins with library staff reaching out to museum leaders, curators, library staff, commercial galleries and artists organizations to identify prominent local artists.  From there, Carbonell creates what she calls a "decision matrix," and logs each artists' accomplishments such as their completion of art school, their exhibitions and recommendations from various organizations. From there, she contacts the artists directly to create a comprehensive file of their work. The system for the cataloging criteria is called the Artist Files Revealed through the Art Libraries Society of North America.

Developments

2014

Discussions with artists and others
Researched the environment
Seeking ideas, partners, project design
Tested the concept

2015

Official launch of the Artists' File Initiative

2016

Feature article in Kansas City Studio Magazine's March/April 2016 issue
National blog feature in the February 2016 issue of Archiving Artists, an IMLS-sponsored project by the University of North Carolina

2017

Hosted Edit-a thon workshop at the Spencer Art Reference Library for local African American artists working in Kansas City, Missouri.
Held exhibition in the Spencer Art Reference Library consisting of 4 participants in the Artist File Initiative titled Natural Inspirations: Kansas City's Artists Inspired by Nature 
Almost 100 co-curated files established with the individual artists
All forms of media represented
Each file is fully described in Worldcat.org and the Nelson-Atkins Libraryonesearch.org - discoverable through the web and accessible for consultation in the Spencer Art Reference Library
The Artists File Initiative was mentioned in a KCUR-FM article written by Laura Spencer regarding Arthur Kraft, published online May 2, 2017.

References

2015 establishments in Missouri
Projects established in 2015
Research projects
Culture of Kansas City, Missouri
Art in Missouri
Archives in the United States
Collections of museums in the United States